Assen Najdenow, Асен Найденов, (12 September 1899 – 10 September 1995) was a Bulgarian conductor.

Life 
Najdenov was born in 1899 in Varna on the Black Sea. In his childhood, he learned the violin and the piano. In 1905, his uncle brought a grand piano from Russia. Already as a pupil he played in the city orchestra as a violinist from 1912 to 1914. In 1920, he studied composition in Vienna with Joseph Marx and piano with Paul de Conne. In 1921, he went to Leipzig, where among others, Fritz Reuter was one of his teachers. Max Hochkofler taught him conducting.

Back in Bulgaria, he made his debut in 1925 with Mignon by Ambroise Thomas at the National Opera and Ballet of Bulgaria. In 1930, he attended courses with Bruno Walter and Clemens Krauss in Salzburg. In 1944, he became chief conductor in Sofia. Guest conducting engagements took him to the Berlin State Opera (Mussorgsky's Khovanshchina in 1958), to Leningrad Mikhailovsky Theatre (Kirill Molchanov's Romeo, Juliet a tma 1962/63) and to the Moscow Bolshoi Theatre (Verdi's Don Carlos 1963/64).

Najdenow specialised in particular in the operas of Mozart, Mussorgsky and Verdi.

The conductor died in Sofia at the age of 95.

Awards 
 Dimitroff-Preis in Gold (1. Classe) (1950, 1952, 1959)
 Volkskünstler der Volksrepublik Bulgarien (1952)
 Held der sozialistischen Arbeit (Bulgaria)
 Order of Georgi Dimitrov
 Orden „Volksrepublik Bulgarien“ I. Stufe

Further reading 
 Lada Brashovanova: Naidenov, Assen. In Grove Music Online (englisch; subscription required).

References

External links 

 
 Assen Najdenow at National Opera and Ballet Theatre Sofia (Bulgarian)

Bulgarian conductors (music)
1899 births
1995 deaths
Musicians from Varna, Bulgaria